The Philippine Senate Committee on Accounts is a standing committee of the Senate of the Philippines.

Jurisdiction 
According to the Rules of the Senate, the committee handles all matters relating to the auditing and adjustment of all accounts chargeable against the funds for the expenses and activities of the Senate.

Members, 19th Congress 
Based on the Rules of the Senate, the Senate Committee on Accounts has 13 members.

The President Pro Tempore, the Majority Floor Leader, and the Minority Floor Leader are ex officio members.

Here are the members of the committee in the 19th Congress as of October 01, 2022:

Committee secretary: Dir. Felipe T. Yadao, Jr.

See also 

List of Philippine Senate committees

References 

Accounts